"Overdose" is a song by American rapper YoungBoy Never Broke Again, released on April 27, 2018, as the introduction of his debut studio album, Until Death Call My Name. In the upbeat Gangsta rap hit, YoungBoy raps about his come-up as an artist while also rapping about firearms, violence, and murder.

Critical reception
HipHopDXs Justin Ivey noted that the track "works perfectly as an opening salvo, displaying his command and presence on a Bighead instrumental that pummels listeners over the head with thunderous bass."

Music video
In the music video - which premiered the day of the song's release - YoungBoy is seen in New Orleans, Louisiana taking influence from Birdman who appears in the video. The video is "complete with raw footage of Youngboy spending quality time with son and friends," however it also pictures YoungBoy "two-stepping in the hallway of–what appears to be his home."

Charts

Certifications

References

2018 songs
YoungBoy Never Broke Again songs
Songs written by YoungBoy Never Broke Again